Eois reducta is a moth in the family Geometridae, meaning its larva moves around in a looping manner. Further contextualizing the species, it belongs to the subfamily Larentiinae. This particular species of moth can be found in Cameroon.

References

Moths described in 1988
Eois
Moths of Africa